Josef Švec (born 20 November 1935) is a Czechoslovak rower. He competed at the 1956 Summer Olympics in Melbourne with the men's eight where they were eliminated in the semi-final.

References

1935 births
Living people
Czechoslovak male rowers
Olympic rowers of Czechoslovakia
Rowers at the 1956 Summer Olympics
European Rowing Championships medalists